The Rape of the Sabine Women is a painting by Peter Paul Rubens. It was commissioned by Philip IV of Spain in 1639 but was still incomplete on Rubens' death a year later. It was completed by the Brussels painter Gaspar de Crayer.

Another version of this painting is now held by the National Gallery, London.

References

Bibliography
Palais des Beux-Arts de Lille (2004) RUBENS.

1640 paintings
Mythological paintings by Peter Paul Rubens
Paintings in Belgium
Paintings depicting Roman myths